Guangdong-Hong Kong Cup 2006–07 is the 29th staging of this two-leg competition between Hong Kong and Guangdong.

The first leg was played in Panyu on 30 December 2006 and the second leg was played in Hong Kong Stadium on 7 January 2007.

The Guangdong match was played in Panyu Fo Ying Dong Stadium in remembrance of the death of Henry Fok, HKFA's Life Honorary President, for Panyu is the home town of Mr. Fok.

Hong Kong captured the champion by winning an aggregate 4–3 after against Guangdong extra time.

Squads

Hong Kong
The first leg's squad consists of 18 players where 15 of them are from Hong Kong and three are mainland Chinese players who are now playing in Hong Kong First Division League. 
The second leg's squad also consists of 18 players which was selected from a 20-people training squad.
Team Manager: 
 Pui Kwan Kay
 Lawrence Kam Kei Yu
Coach: 
 Lai Sun Cheung 
 Tsang Wai Chung
Goalkeeper coach: 
 Chu Kwok Kuen
Physiotherapist: 
 Cousin Yat Hong Lui
Team Assistant: 
 Kwan Kon Sang

(*) Included in first leg's squad only(#) Included in second leg's squad only

Guangdong

Team Manager:
Shen Xiangfu 沈祥福
Head coach:
Gu Guangming 古廣明

  * Included in 1st leg's squad only
  # Included in 2nd leg's squad only

Fixtures
First Leg

Second Leg

See also
 Guangdong-Hong Kong Cup
 2006-07 in Hong Kong football
 Hong Kong First Division League 2006-07
 Hong Kong Senior Shield 2006-07
 Hong Kong League Cup 2006-07
 Hong Kong FA Cup 2006-07

References

External links
 HKFA website 29th Guangdong-HK Cup

 

2007
2007 in Chinese football
2006 in Chinese football
2006–07 in Hong Kong football